The Milford Red Sox was the primary moniker a minor league baseball team that played in Milford, Delaware as members of the Eastern Shore League. After Milford first hosted a team in the 1889 Delaware State League, the Eastern Shore team originated as the Milford Sandpipers (1923), followed by the Milford Giants, a Class-D affiliate of the New York Giants in 1938 and remained that way until the league shut down as a result of World War II in 1942. Milford returned to play after the war, in 1946, as a Boston Red Sox affiliate and played until 1948.

Notable players

 Sid Gordon (1917–1975), 2x Major League All Star

References

External links
Baseball Reference

Defunct Eastern Shore League teams
Boston Red Sox minor league affiliates
New York Giants minor league affiliates
Defunct baseball teams in Delaware
Milford, Delaware
Baseball teams established in 1938
Sports clubs disestablished in 1948
1938 establishments in Delaware
1948 disestablishments in Delaware
Baseball teams disestablished in 1948